The Bridges to Babylon Tour was a worldwide concert tour by The Rolling Stones. Staged in support of their album Bridges to Babylon, the tour visited stadiums from 1997 to 1998. It grossed over $274 million, becoming the second-highest-grossing tour at that time, behind their own Voodoo Lounge Tour of 1994–1995.
The Bridges to Babylon Tour was followed by 1999's No Security Tour.

History
The tour was announced in a press conference held beneath the Brooklyn Bridge in New York City.

The tour began on 9 September 1997 in Toronto, Ontario, Canada, and comprised fifty-six shows in North America, nine shows in South America, six shows in Japan and thirty-seven shows in Europe. It concluded on 19 September 1998 in Istanbul, Turkey.  Five shows were cancelled (in Marseilles, Paris, Lyon, Bilbao and Gijón) and five were postponed (in Italy, Ireland and Great Britain).

The production was designed by Mark Fisher, Charlie Watts, Mick Jagger and Patrick Woodroffe. The show opened with a circular central screen exploding with fireworks, from which guitarist Keith Richards emerged playing the classic riff to "(I Can't Get No) Satisfaction". The stage design included a 46 m (150 ft) long telescoping cantilever bridge that extended from the main stage to a 'B' stage in the center of the field.

One of the innovations was a "web vote" – fans who purchased a ticket could vote for a song they wanted to hear. If a song was picked by the web vote 4 shows in a row it became a permanent part of the set list ("Gimme Shelter" was added early on in the tour and "Under My Thumb" came one shy of 4 on 6 occasions, but never was requested for 4 consecutive shows). A few shows had no web vote (for example, in Brazil, where the band performed with Bob Dylan on "Like a Rolling Stone").

This was the first tour where a B-stage was featured at most shows (they had used one on the Voodoo Lounge Tour, but only at one show). The band normally played three numbers on the B-stage, with the exception of the final show where only two were played there.

The Bridges to Babylon Tour was the second-highest-grossing tour at the time, behind their own record-breaking 1994–1995 Voodoo Lounge Tour. It was believed 4.577 million people attended the tour over the 108 shows – 2.02 million in Europe, 2.009 million in North America, 348,000 in Argentina and Brazil, and 200,000 in Japan. The tour reached 25 countries and is the second–largest North American tour of all time – second to the Rolling Stones' 2005–2007 A Bigger Bang Tour.

The tour is documented by the live album No Security and a DVD release of the St. Louis, Missouri show. In 1999 the band commenced another tour called the No Security Tour, which played smaller venues and fewer destinations.

Among the opening acts was, in October 1997, Sheryl Crow. "They invited me to go on their private plane…" she recalled. "Three weeks before I went on the tour, my band and I watched the Stones film Cocksucker Blues. It's a riot – it's complete debauchery and there are several scenes where they're practically having orgies on their private 747 back in the early '70s. So I got on their plane and I thought, 'Wow, what a difference! We definitely have changed our tune here, haven't we?'"

"Bridges to Bremen", a double CD / Blu-ray / DVD live album, was released in June 2019.

"Bridges to Buenos Aires", a double CD / Blu-ray / DVD live album, was released in November 2019.

Set list
 "(I Can't Get No) Satisfaction"
 "Let's Spend the Night Together"
 "Flip the Switch"
 "Gimme Shelter"
 "Anybody Seen My Baby?"
 "Saint of Me"
 "Out of Control"
 "Miss You"
 "All About You"
 "Wanna Hold You"
 "Sympathy for the Devil"
 "Tumbling Dice"
 "Honky Tonk Women"
 "Start Me Up"
 "Jumpin' Jack Flash"
 "You Can't Always Get What You Want"
 "Brown Sugar"
 "Waiting on a Friend"

Shows

Personnel

The Rolling Stones
Mick Jagger – lead vocals, guitar, harmonica, percussion, keyboards;
Keith Richards – rhythm guitar, vocals;
Ronnie Wood – lead guitar, keyboards;
Charlie Watts – drums;

Additional musicians
Darryl Jones – bass, backing vocals
Chuck Leavell – keyboards, backing vocals
Bobby Keys – saxophone
Andy Snitzer – saxophone, keyboards
Michael Davis – trombone
Kent Smith – trumpet
Lisa Fischer – backing vocals
Bernard Fowler – backing vocals, percussion
Blondie Chaplin – backing vocals, percussion, guitar, keyboards
Pierre de Beauport – keyboards on "Thief in the Night"

See also

 List of highest-grossing concert tours

References

External links
The Rolling Stones' official website

The Rolling Stones concert tours
1997 concert tours
1998 concert tours